Shen Hongbing (born May 1964) is a Chinese epidemiologist and oncologist, director of the Chinese Center for Disease Control and Prevention, and president of Nanjing Medical University from 2014 to 2021.

Biography
Shen was born in Qidong, Nantong, Jiangsu province in 1964. He received his bachelor's degree in preventive medicine and master's degree in epidemiology from Nanjing Medical University in 1986 and 1989, respectively. In 1999, he obtained a doctor's degree from Shanghai Medical College. Since 1989, he has served as lecturer, associate professor and professor of epidemiology teaching and research at Nanjing Medical University. He was a senior visiting scholar at the University of Texas MD Anderson Cancer Center. In June 2014, he was appointed president of Nanjing Medical University. On 26 July 2022, he was appointed director of Chinese Center for Disease Control and Prevention.

Honours and awards
 2009 "Chang Jiang Scholar" (or "Yangtze River Scholar") 
 2013 State Natural Science Award (Second Class) 
 November 22, 2019 Member of the Chinese Academy of Engineering (CAE)

References

1964 births
Living people
People from Qidong, Jiangsu
Physicians from Jiangsu
20th-century Chinese physicians
21st-century Chinese physicians
Chinese epidemiologists
Chinese oncologists
Members of the Chinese Academy of Engineering